Nanmofang Area is an area and township on the southern part of Chaoyang District, Beijing, China. It borders Jianwai Subdistrict and Gaobeidian Township to the north, Fatou Subdistrict and Wangsiying Township to the east, Shibalidian Township to the south, Jinsong, Panjiayuan and Shuangjing Subdistricts to the west. In the year 2020, it has a total population of 127,268.

The current name of this area, Nanmofang, came from a mill house that used to exist within the region.

History

Administrative Divisions 
In the year 2021, there were a total of 23 subdivisions under Nanmofang, in which 21 were communities and 2 were villages:

Landmark 
 Happy Valley Beijing

See also 
 List of township-level divisions of Beijing

References

Chaoyang District, Beijing
Areas of Beijing